is a train station in eastern Tokyo, Japan.

Station layout

History
July 6, 1927 Opened as Togoshi Station (戸越駅).
January 1, 1936 Renamed to the present name.

Traffic
In 2014, 7,434 passengers per day started or ended travel at the station in average.

Surrounding area

Shinagawa Ward Office
Shinagawa Chuo Park
Shimoshinmei Tenso jinjya shrine
Ebara Shichi-Fuku-Jin(Seven Lucky Gods in Ebara area)
Toko-ji temple
Togoshi park
Hoyo no Mori Elementary and Junior High School

References

External links
Shimoshinmei Station information (Tokyu) 

Railway stations in Tokyo
Railway stations in Japan opened in 1927
Tokyu Oimachi Line
Stations of Tokyu Corporation